The 1961 NFL expansion draft was a National Football League (NFL) draft in which a new expansion team, named the Minnesota Vikings, selected its first players. That selection was provided by the expansion draft, held on January 26, 1961.

In August 1959, a group of Minneapolis businessmen were awarded a franchise in the new American Football League (AFL).  In January 1960, they forfeited their AFL membership and were awarded a 90% stake in the 14th franchise of the NFL (the other 10%, under a decades-old agreement, went to former Duluth Kelleys/Eskimos owner Ole Haugsrud).  Though the ownership group had participated in the 1960 American Football League draft before jumping leagues to the NFL, they did not take any of the players they selected in that draft with them. As such, they entered the 1961 draft with an empty roster. So that the Vikings could become competitive with existing teams, the league awarded the Vikings the first pick in the 1961 NFL draft and gave them the opportunity to select current players from existing teams.   In the expansion draft,  the existing franchises listed players from which the Vikings could select to switch to the new team.

Rules of the draft
Every existing NFL team except the Dallas Cowboys listed eight of its 38 players, and the Vikings selected three players on the list from each team.

Player selections

See also
 1961 American Football League draft

References

External links
 Pro Football Hall of Fame – 1961 Draft
 Dbasefootball – 1961 Draft

National Football League expansion draft
Expansion
Minnesota Vikings lists
NFL expansion draft